Pine Creek is a stream in McDonald County in the U.S. state of Missouri. It is a tributary of Big Sugar Creek.

Pine Creek was so named on account of pine timber near its course.

See also
List of rivers of Missouri

References

Rivers of McDonald County, Missouri
Rivers of Missouri